Santu Mofokeng (October 19, 1956 – January 26, 2020) was a South African news and documentary photographer who worked under the alias Mofokengâ. Mofokeng was a member of the Afrapix collective and won a Prince Claus Award.

Early life 
Mofokeng was born on October 19, 1956, in Soweto, Johannesburg.

Career 
While still a teenager, he began his career as a street photographer, went on to work as an assistant in a darkroom, and then worked as a news photographer. Subsequently, he joined the collective Afrapix, working under the alias Mofokengâ. Initially he mainly documented the struggle against apartheid in South Africa.

In 1988 he started working with the African Studies Institute at the University of the Witwatersrand (Wits), where he worked alongside Revisionist Charles Van Onselen. Mofokeng's writing improved significantly during his time at the University. He spent much of the next 10 years collecting photographs of South Africa's middle class. While at Wits, Mofokeng realized the importance of answering even the simplest of questions in photography, questions like “What are you doing?” and “Is this what you mean?”. This process helped Mofokeng transform the way he looked at photography and find the true meaning of each photo he took.

Mofokeng emphasized the spiritual dimension of his work, as in the series Chasing Shadows from 1997. After starting off with street and news photography, he specialized in landscapes. Later projects show his deep concern for the condition of the (biophysical) environment at the beginning of the 21st century.

At his exhibition Let's Talk in 2010, he explained that the essence is not what you see in these photographs, but what you don't see (but feel).On January 26, 2020, Mofokeng  died of progressive supranuclear palsy, a degenerative brain disease, in Johannesburg.

 Solo exhibitions 
1990: Like Shifting Sand, Market Galleries, Johannesburg
1994: Rumours / The Bloemhof Portfolio, Market Galleries, Johannesburg
1995: Distorting Mirror/Townships Imagined, Worker's Library, Johannesburg
1997: Chasing Shadows – Gertrude Posel Gallery, University of the Witwatersrand, Johannesburg
1998: Black Photo Album/Look at Me, Netherlands Photo Institute, Rotterdam
1998: Chasing Shadows, Netherlands Photo Institute, Rotterdam
1998: Lunarscapes, Netherlands Photo Institute, Rotterdam
1999: Black Photo Album/Look at Me, FNAC Montparnasse
2000: Chasing Shadows, Transparencies International, Berlin
2000: Sad Landscapes, Camouflage Gallery, Johannesburg
2003: Chasing Shadows, Memling Museum, Bruges
2004: Rethinking Landscape, Centre photographique d'Ile-de-France (CPIF), Pontault-Combault
2004: Santu Mofokeng, David Krut Projects, New York City
2006: Invoice Iziko, South African National Art Museum, Cape Town
2007: Invoice, Standard Bank Art Museum, Johannesburg
2008: Homeland Security, Johannesburg Art Museum
2008: Santu Mofokeng's Landscape, Warren Siebrits, Johannesburg
2009: Mofokeng survey exhibition, Autograph ABP, London
2010: Chasing Shadows, Anne Arbor Institute of Humanities, Michigan
2010: Let's Talk, Arts on Main, Johannesburg
2010: Remaining Past, Minshar Art Institute, Tel Aviv
2011–12: Chasing Shadows'', Paris, Bern, Bergen, Antwerp

Awards 
 1991: Ernest Cole Scholarship, for study at the International Center of Photography, in New York City
 1992: 1st Mother Jones Award for Africa
 1998: Künstlerhaus Worpswede Fellowship, Germany
 1999: Contre Jour Residency, Marseille
 1999: DAAD Fellowship, Worpswede, Germany
 2001: DAAD Fellowship, Worpswede, Germany
2007: Ruth First Fellowship
2009: Prince Claus Award, Netherlands
2016: International Photography Prize, Fondazione Fotografia Modena – Sky Arte, Italy

References 

1956 births
2020 deaths
South African photographers
People from Soweto